August 2014

See also

References 

 08
August 2014 events in the United States